Karolew may refer to the following places:
Karolew, Gmina Bedlno in Łódź Voivodeship (central Poland)
Karolew, Gmina Strzelce in Łódź Voivodeship (central Poland)
Karolew, Łowicz County in Łódź Voivodeship (central Poland)
Karolew, Zduńska Wola County in Łódź Voivodeship (central Poland)
Karolew, Zgierz County in Łódź Voivodeship (central Poland)
Karolew, Grójec County in Masovian Voivodeship (east-central Poland)
Karolew, Płock County in Masovian Voivodeship (east-central Poland)
Karolew, Sokołów County in Masovian Voivodeship (east-central Poland)
Karolew, Gmina Dąbrówka in Masovian Voivodeship (east-central Poland)
Karolew, Gmina Klembów in Masovian Voivodeship (east-central Poland)
Karolew, Greater Poland Voivodeship (west-central Poland)